Several United States Navy ships have borne the name Florida, in honor of the state of Florida:

Florida (1824) was a sloop that served on survey duty between 1824 and 1831. Her final cruise, between 1 June 1830 and 31 May 1831, was under the command of Lieutenant T. R. Gedney.
Florida (1834) was a steamboat built in Savannah, Georgia, and operated on the St. Johns River during the Second Seminole War.
  was a side-wheel steamboat purchased in 1861 and sold after 1867.
  was originally the screw frigate USS Wampanoag, renamed in 1869, and sold in 1885.
  was an  monitor commissioned in 1903, renamed to USS Tallahassee in 1908, redesignated as IX-16 in 1921 and decommissioned and sold in 1922.
  was the lead ship of her class of battleship, commissioned 1911 and scrapped in 1932.
  is an  cruise missile submarine, originally commissioned in 1983 as a ballistic missile submarine designated SSBN-728.

See also
 CSS Florida

References

United States Navy ship names